Jon Lizotte (born November 10, 1994) is an American professional ice hockey defenseman currently playing for the Wilkes-Barre/Scranton Penguins of the American Hockey League (AHL).

Playing career
Lizotte was born in Minot, North Dakota where his parents own and operate a fireworks business. He grew up in Grand Forks, North Dakota.  He played four seasons of college hockey with the St. Cloud State Huskies from 2015 to 2019 and was signed as a free agent by the Wild on July 28, 2021 to a one year deal after played for the Wilkes-Barre/Scranton Penguins in the American Hockey League since 2019.

In the  season, Lizotte was recalled by the Wild from AHL affiliate, the Iowa Wild and made his NHL Debut on October 28, 2021 in a game against the Seattle Kraken.

As a free agent following the conclusion of his contract with the Wild, Lizotte opted to return to former AHL club, the Wilkes-Barre/Scranton Penguins, by agreeing to a one-year contract on July 15, 2022.

Career statistics

Awards and honors

References

External links

1994 births
Living people
American men's ice hockey defensemen
Iowa Wild players
Minnesota Wild players
St. Cloud State Huskies men's ice hockey players
Undrafted National Hockey League players
Wilkes-Barre/Scranton Penguins players
Ice hockey people from North Dakota